Rancho Alegre Airport  is an airstrip serving Rancho Alegre, a ranch in the Beni Department of Bolivia.

See also

Transport in Bolivia
List of airports in Bolivia

References

External links 
OpenStreetMap - Rancho Alegre
OurAirports - Rancho Alegre
FallingRain - Rancho Alegre Airport

Airports in Beni Department